The Premier A Slovenian Basketball League, abbreviated as 1. SKL and known as the Liga Nova KBM due to sponsorship reasons, is the top-level professional men's basketball league in Slovenia. The league, operated by the Basketball Federation of Slovenia, consists of eleven clubs. The most successful team is Cedevita Olimpija with 19 titles.

History
The league was founded in 1991, shortly after Slovenia's independence from SFR Yugoslavia. Before the independence, the Slovenian Republic League was played as a second or third level of Yugoslav basketball. Olimpija, Ljubljana, Slovan, ŽKK Maribor, Lesonit, and Branik Maribor were the only Slovenian teams that played in the Yugoslav First Federal League.

Names
Since 1991, the league has been named after sponsors on several occasions, giving it the following names: 
Liga Kolinska (1998–2001)
HYPO Liga (2001–2002)
1. A SKL (2002–2006)
Liga UPC Telemach (2006–2009)
Liga Telemach (2009–2016)
Liga Nova KBM (2016–2019)
1. SKL (2019–2020)
Liga Nova KBM (2020)
1. SKL (2020–21)
Liga Nova KBM (2021–present)

Competition format

In the regular season, ten teams play each other three times for a total of 27 games. If a team competes in international competitions (Basketball Champions League, EuroLeague or EuroCup Basketball) and plays at least ten international games per season, that team automatically enters the quarterfinals and does not compete in the regular season. The bottom-placed team of the regular season is relegated to the 2. SKL.

The top seven teams from the regular season advance to the quarterfinals and are joined by a team that did not compete in the regular season. In the quarterfinals and semifinals, a best-of-three playoff is used. The semifinal winners advance to the best-of-five championship finals, with the winners being crowned league champion.

Current teams
As of the 2022–23 season

Finals

Titles by club

Finals appearances

Statistical leaders

See also
 Slovenian Cup
 Slovenian Supercup

References

External links
  
 Slovenian League on Eurobasket.com

 
1
Slovenia
Sports leagues established in 1991
1991 establishments in Slovenia
Professional sports leagues in Slovenia